François-Auguste de Thou (24 August 1604 - 12 September 1642) was a French magistrate.

He was born in Paris, the eldest son of Jacques-Auguste de Thou. In 1617, with the death of his father, he inherited the office of Master of the Bookstore. Nicolas Rigault, guard of the Library of the King, assumed that office with his arrest.

He was a councillor to the parliament of Paris in 1626 and a conseiller d'État shortly afterwards. From 1632 to 1635, he was steward of Burgundy and steward of the armies with Cardinal Louis de Nogaret of Valletta.

He was unwise enough to link himself to Cardinal Richelieu's enemies. His misguided mediation between Anne of Austria and Marie de Rohan was pardoned, but he fell in the conspiracy between Spain and Cinq-Mars, a favorite of king Louis XIII. For not revealing what he knew of the conspiracy, his silence was taken as proof of guilt and he was beheaded at Lyon on the same day as Cinq-Mars on Richelieu's orders.

He was a manuscript collector; his collection included the Greek minuscule manuscript known as Minuscule 601 (Gregory-Åland).

A famous 19th century historical painting by Paul Delaroche shows Cardinal Richelieu in a gorgeous barge, preceding the boat carrying De Thou and Cinq-Mars to their execution.

Notes

1604 births
1642 deaths
French politicians